Ulsan Wholesale Agricultural and Fish Market is a wholesale market in Nam-gu, Ulsan, South Korea. The market comprises two structures, a covered area where agricultural products are sold, and a building that houses the fish market and several restaurants that prepare the fish after they are purchased. Prepared dishes include hoe, sannakji, and maeuntang. The market often sells whale meat and whales are sometimes butchered at the exterior of the fish market.

See also
 List of South Korean tourist attractions
 List of markets in South Korea

References

Fish markets
Food markets in South Korea
Nam District, Ulsan
Wholesale markets